Gaz is an Iranian nougat that originated in the Isfahan region. It is widely known as Persian Nougat in American and European countries. It is made from pistachio, almond kernels, rose-water, egg whites and sap from Persian manna. 

Typically gaz is accompanied by tea or sherbet and is eaten as a dessert after a main course. It is also traditionally served on festive occasions such as Nowruz, the Persian New Year.

Etymology
The Persian word Gaz is associated with gaz-angobīn which translates to 'Honey of Gaz', in reference to a species of Tamarisk, T. gallica that is native to the Zagros mountain range located to the west of Isfahan. Gaz is traditionally presumed to be the sap of the Tamarisk tree.

History
Gaz dates backs to 450 years ago in Isfahan, when the sap found on the Tamarisk tree was combined with flour, bread, pistachios, almonds and chocolate in traditional and industrial workshops. The height of this mountain tree reaches a height of two meters and it usually grows in good weather in the mountains of Bakhtiari and Khansar. The product of this tree becomes ready to harvest in the late summer and the shiny and yellow grains come out in the stems like millet. At this time, the owners of the trees must harvest them before the autumnal rains.

The sweet, milky honey (angobīn) found on the Gaz plant is associated with manna, a food mentioned in the religious texts of the Abrahamic religions.

Manufacture and style
Although originally believed to be sap manufactured by the Tamarisk tree, the sticky white substance was found to be formed from honeydew, which is exuded from the anus of the nymph of a psyllid insect, either Cyamophila astragalicola or C. dicora, in its final instar, which live on plants of Astragalus adscendens, and is collected annually and is combined with other ingredients including pistachio or almond kernels, rosewater and egg white. Modern versions of gaz may use sugar and corn syrup as substitutes for psyllid manna.

The traditional way to serve gaz is in round pieces that are about 2 inches in diameter and up to ½ inch thick. A modern presentation is to serve the nougat cut into smaller rectangles. Depending on the added ingredients, gaz can have a subtle rose flavour, a nutty taste, or a savoury and pungent profile, and it can be white, or another colour due to the addition of spices (such as saffron) or nuts.

Nowruz
Celebrations such as Nowruz, the Persian New Year, feature gaz. During the Nowruz holiday, family and friends visit each other's homes and, typically, the host offers fruits and sweets to their guests. Served with sherbet or tea, gaz is a favorite delicacy and a much-appreciated gift as it helps to ensure that a household will have ample snacks to serve all holiday visitors.

See also
 Turrón
 Divinity (confectionery)

References

Candy
Iranian desserts
Nut dishes